XMV may refer to:

 Malagasy language (ISO 639 language code xmv)
 Vox Novus XMV (eXperimental Music Video), a single-night music video festival in New York City hosted by Vox Novus
 iShares MSCI Canada Minimum Volatility Index (stock ticker XMV), an ETF from Blackrock; see List of Canadian exchange-traded funds

See also

 
 XM 5 (disambiguation)